Mini Marvels is an all-ages comic book written and illustrated by Chris Giarrusso and published by Marvel Comics. The comic has been published in the form of back-ups in other comic books as well as original one-shots and trade paperback collections. The comics are a humorous depiction of the Marvel heroes as children of various ages, sometimes parodying storylines from the mainstream Marvel universe.

Bullpen Bits
The Mini Marvels were originally in a comic strip called "Bullpen Bits", published in Bullpen Bulletins. They now can be viewed in several Mini Marvels trade paperbacks.

Running Gags
 Neither Aunt May or J. Jonah Jameson ever notice that Peter Parker is Spider-Man, despite him always wearing his costume and using his powers around them.
 Hawkeye often complains about being in Captain America's shadow
 Hulk, Red Hulk, and original character Blue Hulk, often get into various adventures
 Daredevil is always facing the wrong direction.

Collections
 Giant-Size Mini Marvels #1 - "Paperboy Blues" and a collection of "Bullpen Bits"
 Spidey and the Mini Marvels #1 - "Paperboy Showdown" and "Cereal Quest"
 Mini Marvels Volume 1: Rock, Paper, Scissors - All comics from the above two collections, plus several other stories
 Mini Marvels Volume 2: Secret Invasion - More stories and "Bullpen Bits" by Giarrusso, as well as a few stories written by others
 Mini Marvels: Ultimate Collection - All the stories from Volumes 1 and 2, Five new stories, and a complete collection of Bullpen Bits

References

External links
 Chris Giarrusso's Official site

Marvel Comics titles
Superhero comics
Humor comics
Marvel Comics child superheroes